Enzo Anselmo Giuseppe Maria Ferrari  (20 February 1898 – 14 August 1988) was an Italian motor racing driver and entrepreneur, the founder of the Scuderia Ferrari Grand Prix motor racing team, and subsequently of the Ferrari automobile marque. He was widely known as "il Commendatore" or "il Drake". In his final years he was often referred to as "l'Ingegnere" ("the Engineer") or "il Grande Vecchio" ("the Grand Old Man").

Early life 
Enzo Ferrari was said to have been born on 18 February 1898 in Modena, Italy and that his birth was recorded on 20 February because a heavy snowstorm had prevented his father from reporting the birth at the local registry office; in reality, his birth certificate states he was born on 20 February 1898, while the birth's registration took place on 24 February 1898 and was reported by the midwife. He was the younger of two children to Alfredo Ferrari and Adalgisa Bisbini, after his elder sibling Alfredo Junior (Dino). Alfredo Senior was the son of a grocer from Carpi, and started a workshop fabricating metal parts at the family home. Enzo grew up with little formal education. At the age of 10 he witnessed Felice Nazzaro's win at the 1908 Circuito di Bologna, an event that inspired him to become a racing driver. During World War I he served in the 3rd Mountain Artillery Regiment of the Italian Army. His father Alfredo, and his older brother, Alfredo Jr., died in 1916 as a result of a widespread Italian flu outbreak. Ferrari became severely sick himself in the 1918 flu pandemic and was consequently discharged from the Italian service.

Racing career 

Following the family's carpentry business collapse, Ferrari started searching for a job in the car industry. He unsuccessfully volunteered his services to Fiat in Turin, eventually settling for a job as test-driver for C.M.N. (Costruzioni Meccaniche Nazionali), a car manufacturer in Milan which rebuilt used truck bodies into small passenger cars. He was later promoted to race car driver and made his competitive debut in the 1919 Parma-Poggio di Berceto hillclimb race, where he finished fourth in the three-litre category at the wheel of a 2.3-litre 4-cylinder C.M.N. 15/20. On 23 November of the same year, he took part in the Targa Florio but had to retire after his car's fuel tank developed a leak. Due to the large number of retirements, he finished 9th. 

In 1920, Ferrari joined the racing department of Alfa Romeo as a driver. Ferrari won his first Grand Prix in 1923 in Ravenna on the Savio Circuit. 1924 was his best season, with three wins, including Ravenna, Polesine and the Coppa Acerbo in Pescara. Deeply shocked by the death of Ugo Sivocci in 1923 and Antonio Ascari in 1925, Ferrari, by his own admission, continued to race half-heartedly. At the same time, he developed a taste for the organisational aspects of Grand Prix racing. Following the birth of his son Alfredo (Dino) in 1932, Ferrari decided to retire and to focus instead on the management and development of the factory Alfa race cars, eventually building up a raceteam of superstar drivers, including Giuseppe Campari and Tazio Nuvolari. This team was called Scuderia Ferrari (founded by Enzo in 1929) and acted as a racing division for Alfa Romeo. The team was very successful, thanks to excellent cars like the Alfa Romeo P3 and to the talented drivers, like Nuvolari. Ferrari retired from competitive driving having participated in 41 Grands Prix with a record of 11 wins.

In this period the prancing horse emblem began to show up on his team's cars. The emblem had been created and sported by Italian fighter plane pilot Francesco Baracca. During World War I, Baracca's mother gave Ferrari a necklace with the prancing horse on it prior to takeoff. Baracca was shot down and killed by an Austrian aeroplane in 1918. In memory of his death, Ferrari used the prancing horse to create the emblem that would become the world-famous Ferrari shield. Initially displayed on Alfa Romeos, the shield was first seen on a Ferrari in 1947.

Building Ferrari 
Alfa Romeo agreed to partner Ferrari's racing team until 1933, when financial constraints forced them to withdraw their support – a decision subsequently retracted thanks to the intervention of Pirelli. Despite the quality of the Scuderia drivers, the team struggled to compete with Auto Union and Mercedes. Although the German manufacturers dominated the era, Ferrari's team achieved a notable victory in 1935 when Tazio Nuvolari beat Rudolf Caracciola and Bernd Rosemeyer on their home turf at the German Grand Prix.

In 1937 Scuderia Ferrari was dissolved and Ferrari returned to Alfa's racing team, named "Alfa Corse". Alfa Romeo decided to regain full control of its racing division, retaining Ferrari as Sporting Director. After a disagreement with Alfa's managing director Ugo Gobbato, Ferrari left in 1939 and founded Auto-Avio Costruzioni, a company supplying parts to other racing teams. Although a contract clause restricted him from racing or designing cars for four years, Ferrari managed to manufacture two cars for the 1940 Mille Miglia, which were driven by Alberto Ascari and Lotario Rangoni. With the outbreak of World War II, Ferrari's factory was forced to undertake war production for Mussolini's fascist government. Following Allied bombing of the factory, Ferrari relocated from Modena to Maranello. At the end of the war, Ferrari decided to start making cars bearing his name, and founded Ferrari S.p.A. in 1947.

Enzo decided to battle the dominating Alfa Romeos and race with his own team. The team's open-wheel debut took place in Turin in 1948 and the first win came later in the year in Lago di Garda. The first major victory came at the 1949 24 Hours of Le Mans, with a Ferrari 166 MM driven by Luigi Chinetti and (Baron Selsdon of Scotland) Peter Mitchell-Thomson. In 1950 Ferrari enrolled in the newly born Drivers World Championship and is the only team to remain continuously present since its introduction. Ferrari won his first world championship Grand Prix with José Froilán González at Silverstone in 1951. Apocryphally, Enzo cried like a baby when his team finally defeated the mighty Alfetta 159. The first championship came in 1952, with Alberto Ascari, a task that was repeated one year later. In 1953 Ferrari made his only attempt at the Indianapolis 500. In order to finance his racing endeavours in Formula One as well as in other events such as the Mille Miglia and Le Mans, the company started selling sports cars.

Ferrari's decision to continue racing in the Mille Miglia brought the company new victories and greatly increased public recognition. However, increasing speeds, poor roads, and nonexistent crowd protection eventually spelled disaster for both the race and Ferrari. During the 1957 Mille Miglia, near the town of Guidizzolo, a 4.0-litre Ferrari 335 S driven by Alfonso de Portago was traveling at 250 km/h when it blew a tyre and crashed into the roadside crowd, killing de Portago, his co-driver and nine spectators, five of whom were children. In response, Enzo Ferrari and Englebert, the tyre manufacturer, were charged with manslaughter in a lengthy criminal prosecution that was finally dismissed in 1961.

Deeply unsatisfied with the way motorsports were covered in the Italian press, in 1961 Ferrari supported Bologna-based publisher Luciano Conti's decision to start a new publication, Autosprint. Ferrari himself regularly contributed to the magazine for a few years.

Many of Ferrari's greatest victories came at Le Mans (nine victories, including six in a row in 1960–1965) and in Formula One during the 1950s and 1960s, with the successes of Juan Manuel Fangio (1956), Mike Hawthorn (1958), and Phil Hill (1961).

The Great Walkout
Enzo Ferrari's strong personality and controversial management style became notorious in 1962. Following a rather weak title defence of Phil Hill's 1961 world title, sales manager Girolamo Gardini, together with manager Romolo Tavoni, chief engineer Carlo Chiti, sports car development chief Giotto Bizzarrini and other key figures in the company left Ferrari to found the rival car manufacturer and racing team Automobili Turismo e Sport (ATS). Based in Bologna, and financially supported by Count Giovanni Volpi, ATS managed to lure away Phil Hill and Giancarlo Baghetti from Ferrari, who responded by promoting junior engineers like Mauro Forghieri, Sergio Scaglietti and Gian Paolo Dallara, and hiring Ludovico Scarfiotti, Lorenzo Bandini, Willy Mairesse and John Surtees to drive his Formula One cars.

The "great walkout" came at an especially difficult time for Ferrari. At the urging of Chiti, the company was developing a new 250-based model. Even if the car would be finished, it was unclear if it could be raced successfully. Ferrari's shakeup proved to be successful. The mid-engined Dino racers laid the foundation for Forghieri's dominant 250-powered 250 P. John Surtees won the world title in 1964 following a tense battle with Jim Clark and Graham Hill. The Dino road cars sold well, and other models like the 275 and Daytona were on the way. Conversely, ATS, following a troubled Formula One 1963 campaign, with both cars retiring four times in five races, folded at the end of the year.

In 1998, Tavoni declared in an interview that he and the remainder of Ferrari's senior figures did not leave on their own initiative, but were ousted following a disagreement with Ferrari over the role of his wife in the company. He said: "Our mistake was to go to a lawyer and write him a letter, instead of openly discussing the issue with him. We knew that his wife wasn't well. We should have been able to deal with it in a different way. When he called the meeting to fire us, he had already nominated our successors."

Merging with Fiat 
By the end of the 1960s, increasing financial difficulties as well as the problem of racing in many categories and having to meet new safety and clean air emissions requirement for road car production and development, caused Ferrari to start looking for a business partner. In 1969 Ferrari sold 50% of his company to Fiat S.p.A., with the caveat that he would remain 100% in control of the racing activities and that Fiat would pay a sizable subsidy until his death for use by his Maranello and Modena production plants. Ferrari had previously offered Ford the opportunity to buy the firm in 1963 for US$18 million ($ in  dollars ) but, late in negotiations, Ferrari withdrew once he realized that Ford would not agree to grant him independent control of the company racing department. Ferrari became a joint-stock company, and Fiat took a small share in 1965. In 1969, Fiat increased their holding to 50% of the company. In 1988 Fiat's holding rose to 90%.

Following the agreement with Fiat, Ferrari stepped down as managing director of the road car division in 1971. In 1974, Ferrari appointed Luca Cordero di Montezemolo as Sporting Director/Formula One Team manager. Montezemolo eventually assumed the presidency of Ferrari in 1992, a post he held until September 2014. Clay Regazzoni was runner-up in 1974, while Niki Lauda won the championship in 1975 and 1977. In 1977, Ferrari was criticized in the press for replacing World Champion Lauda with newcomer Gilles Villeneuve. Ferrari claimed that Villeneuve's aggressive driving style reminded him of Tazio Nuvolari. These feelings were reinforced after the 1979 French Grand Prix when Villeneuve finished second after an intense battle with René Arnoux. According to technical director Mauro Forghieri, "When we returned to Maranello, Ferrari was ecstatic. I have never seen him so happy for a second place".

The Modena Autodrome 
In the early 1970s, Ferrari, aided by fellow Modena constructors Maserati and Automobili Stanguellini, demanded that the Modena Town Council and Automobile Club d'Italia upgrade the Modena Autodrome, the reasoning being that the race track was obsolete and inadequate to test modern racing cars. The proposal was initially discussed with interest, but eventually stalled due to lack of political will. Ferrari then proceeded to buy the land adjacent to his factory and build the Fiorano Circuit, a 3 km track still in use to test Ferrari racing and road cars.

Final years 
After Jody Scheckter won the title in 1979, the team experienced a disastrous 1980 campaign. In 1981 Ferrari attempted to revive his team's fortunes by switching to turbo engines. In 1982, the second turbo-powered Ferrari, the 126C2, showed great promise. However, driver Gilles Villeneuve was killed in an accident during the last session of free practice for the Belgian Grand Prix in Zolder in May. In August, at Hockenheim, teammate Didier Pironi had his career cut short in a violent end over end flip on the misty back straight after hitting the Renault F1 driven by Alain Prost. Pironi was leading the driver's championship at the time; he would lose the lead and the championship by five points as he sat out the remaining five races. The Scuderia went on to win the Constructors Championship at the end of the season and in 1983, with driver René Arnoux in contention for the championship until the very last race. Michele Alboreto finished second in 1985 but the team would not see championship glory again before Ferrari's death in 1988. The final race win for the team he saw was when Gerhard Berger and Alboreto scored a 1-2 finish at the final round of the 1987 season in Australia.

Racing and management controversies
Ferrari's management style was autocratic and he was known to pit drivers against each other in the hope of improving their performance. Some critics believe that Ferrari deliberately increased psychological pressure on his drivers, encouraging intra-team rivalries and fostering an atmosphere of intense competition for the position of number one driver. "He thought that psychological pressure would produce better results for the drivers," said Ferrari team driver Tony Brooks. "He would expect a driver to go beyond reasonable limits... You can drive to the maximum of your ability, but once you start psyching yourself up to do things that you don't feel are within your ability it gets stupid. There was enough danger at that time without going over the limit." According to Mario Andretti, "[Ferrari] just demanded results. But he was a guy that also understood when the cars had shortcomings. He was one that could always appreciate the effort that a driver made, when you were just busting your butt, flat out, flinging the car, and all that. He knew and saw that. He was all-in. Had no other interest in life outside of motor racing and all of the intricacies of it. Somewhat misunderstood in many ways because he was so demanding, so tough on everyone, but at the end of the day he was correct. Always correct. And that’s why you had the respect that you had for him."

Between 1955 and 1971 eight Ferrari drivers were killed driving Ferrari racing cars: Alberto Ascari, Eugenio Castellotti, Alfonso de Portago, Luigi Musso, Peter Collins, Wolfgang von Trips, Lorenzo Bandini and Ignazio Giunti. Although such a high death toll was not unusual in motor racing in those days, the Vatican newspaper L’Osservatore Romano described Ferrari as being like the god Saturn, who consumed his own sons. In Ferrari's defence, contemporary F1 race car driver Stirling Moss commented: "I can't think of a single occasion where a (Ferrari) driver's life was taken because of mechanical failure."

In public Ferrari was careful to acknowledge the drivers who risked their life for his team, insisting that praise should be shared equally between car and driver for any race won. However, his longtime friend and company accountant, Carlo Benzi, related that privately Ferrari would say that "the car was the reason for any success."

Following the deaths of Giuseppe Campari in 1933 and Alberto Ascari in 1955, both of whom he had a strong personal relationship with, he chose not to get too close to his drivers, out of fear of emotionally hurting himself. Later in life, he relented his position and grew very close to Clay Regazzoni and especially Gilles Villeneuve.

Personal life
Enzo Ferrari spent a reserved life, and rarely granted interviews. He seldom left Modena and Maranello and never went to any Grands Prix outside of Italy after the 1950s. He was usually seen at the Grands Prix at Monza near Milan and/or Imola, not far from the Ferrari factory, where the circuit was named after the late Dino. His last known trip abroad was in 1982 when he went to Paris to broker a compromise between the warring FISA and FOCA parties. He never flew in an aeroplane and never set foot in a lift.

He married Laura Domenica Garello (c. 1900–1978) on 28 April 1923, and they remained married until her death. They had one son, Alfredo "Dino", who was born in 1932 and groomed as Enzo's successor, but he suffered from ill-health and died from muscular dystrophy in 1956. Enzo had a second son, Piero, with his mistress Lina Lardi in 1945. As divorce was illegal in Italy until 1975, Piero could only be recognized as Enzo's son after Laura's death in 1978. Piero is currently the vice chairman of the Ferrari company with a 10% share ownership.

Ferrari was made a Cavaliere del Lavoro in 1952, to add to his honours of Cavaliere and Commendatore in the 1920s. He also received a number of honorary degrees, including the Hammarskjöld Prize in 1962, the Columbus Prize in 1965, and the De Gasperi Award in 1987. He was posthumously inducted into the International Motorsports Hall of Fame (1994) and the Automotive Hall of Fame (2000).

Death 
Ferrari died on 14 August 1988 in Maranello at the age of 90. No cause of death was given. His death was not made public until two days later, as by Enzo's request, to compensate for the late registration of his birth. He witnessed the launch of the Ferrari F40 shortly before his death, which was dedicated as a symbol of his achievements. In 2002 Ferrari began production of the Ferrari Enzo, named after its founder.

The Italian Grand Prix was held just weeks after Ferrari's death, and the result was a 1–2 finish for Ferrari, with the Austrian Gerhard Berger leading home Italian and Milan native Michele Alboreto; it was the only race that McLaren did not win that season. Since Ferrari's death, the Scuderia Ferrari team has remained successful.

Racing record

Grand Prix wins

In popular culture 
The 2003 film Ferrari was based on his life. He is portrayed by Sergio Castellitto. Augusto Dallara played Enzo in a bit part in the 2013 film Rush. In the November 2019 film Ford v Ferrari, Ferrari is portrayed by Italian actor Remo Girone. Gabriel Byrne played Enzo Ferrari in the 2022 film Lamborghini: The Man Behind the Legend. The upcoming 2023 film Ferrari is based on his life. In August 2015, Christian Bale was reported to be playing Enzo Ferrari but left on January 15, 2016 due to health concerns. In March 2017, Hugh Jackman replaced Bale to play Enzo in Michael Mann's biopic. As of February 2022, it has been confirmed that Adam Driver will be playing Enzo, replacing Jackman. In April 2015, Robert De Niro also declared his interest in playing Enzo Ferrari in a biopic. 

A popular joke among fans of association football holds that German footballer Mesut Özil is the reincarnation of Enzo Ferrari. Özil bears a striking resemblance to Ferrari, and was born two months after Ferrari's death.

See also
 Ferrari (film)
 The Snake and the Stallion

Notes

References

External links 

 Grand Prix History — Hall of Fame , Enzo Ferrari
 GrandPrix.com biography
 Enzo Ferrari entrepreneur

 
1898 births
1988 deaths
Businesspeople from Modena
Alfa Romeo people
Ferrari people
Formula One team owners
Grand Prix drivers
International Motorsports Hall of Fame inductees
Italian automotive pioneers
Italian founders of automobile manufacturers
Italian racing drivers
Italian motorsport people
Italian military personnel of World War I
Knights Grand Cross of the Order of Merit of the Italian Republic
Automotive businesspeople
Sportspeople from Modena